This is a list of electoral results for the electoral district of Glenelg in Victorian state elections.

Members for Glenelg

Election results

Elections in the 1920s

 Two party preferred vote was estimated.

Elections in the 1910s

References

Victoria (Australia) state electoral results by district